Russell is the lava-flooded remains of a lunar impact crater. It is located in the western part of the Oceanus Procellarum, close to the western lunar limb. As a result, it appears oblong-shaped due to foreshortening.

The south-southwestern rim of Russell overlaps the larger rim of the lava-flooded crater Struve, and together the two crater rims form a figure-8 outline with a wide gap where they are joined. To the east of Russell is Briggs, and to the southeast, adjacent to Struve, is the lava-flooded remains of a crater called Eddington.

The rim of Russell is heavily worn and irregular in form, with multiple crater impacts overlying the wall. The largest of these is Briggs A on the eastern rim. To the north of Russell are the flooded remnants of several smaller craters. Russell's lava-flooded floor is flat and level with the surrounding mare. It lacks a central peak.

In the past this crater was sometimes designated as Otto Struve A, or just assumed to be part of the larger Struve. The crater Eddington to the southeast has also been designated as Otto Struve A on old lunar maps.

Satellite craters 
By convention these features are identified on lunar maps by placing the letter on the side of the crater midpoint that is closest to Russell.

See also 
 1762 Russell, asteroid
 Russell (Martian crater)

References 

 
 
 
 
 
 
 
 
 
 
 
 

Impact craters on the Moon